Front Theatre (German: Fronttheater) is a 1942 German drama film directed by Arthur Maria Rabenalt and starring Heli Finkenzeller, René Deltgen and Lothar Firmans.

It was made at the Babelsberg Studios in Berlin and the Cinetone Studios in Amsterdam. Location shooting took place in occupied Bordeaux and Greece. The film's sets were designed by the art directors Carlo Böhm and Willi Herrmann.

Plot
A woman gives up her successful acting career to support her Doctor husband. Later she takes part in entertainment for German forces during the Second World War.

Cast
Heli Finkenzeller as Lena Meinhardt-Andres 
René Deltgen as Dr. Paul Meinhardt 
Lothar Firmans as Langhammer, director
Wilhelm Strienz as chamber singer Herrmann 
 as Hilde Keller 
 as Monika Keller 
Willi Rose as Alwin Sommer 
Rudolf Schündler as Walter Hülsen 
Bruni Löbel as Gerda Hoffmann 
Hilde von Stolz as Edith Reiß 
Gerhard Dammann as Pietsch 
Adolf Fischer as Otto Zielke 
 as Kummer 
Ernö René as Bosco
Alice Treff as Beamtin beim Arbeitsamt
Elsa Wagner as Alte Schauspielerin
Hermann Pfeiffer as Reiseleiter einer Künstlertruppe
Ernst Karchow as Dr. Gall
 Heinz Ruhmann as himself

References

External links

1942 romantic drama films
1940s war drama films
German romantic drama films
German war drama films
Films of Nazi Germany
Films directed by Arthur Maria Rabenalt
German black-and-white films
Terra Film films
Films shot in France
Films shot in Greece
War romance films
World War II films made in wartime
Films about theatre
Films shot at Babelsberg Studios
1940s German films
1930s German films